Sáenz Peña may refer to:
Luis Sáenz Peña (1822-1907), former president of Argentina (1892–1895)
Roque Sáenz Peña (1851-1914), former president of Argentina (1910–1914)
Presidencia Roque Sáenz Peña, Chaco Province, Argentina
Sáenz Peña, Buenos Aires Province, Argentina
Sáenz Peña (Buenos Aires Metro), a station
Sáenz Peña Law, which reformed electoral law in Argentina (1912)

See also
Roque Sáenz Peña (disambiguation)
Peña (disambiguation)
Sáenz (disambiguation)